The House of Assembly is the unicameral legislature of Anguilla. It has 13 members, 7 members in single-seat constituencies,  4 members representing the island at-large and 2 ex officio members. Anguilla has a multi-party system.

2020 general election

By constituency

See also
List of speakers of the Anguilla House of Assembly

Legislatures of British Overseas Territories
Government of Anguilla
Anguilla